
Gmina Dębica is a rural gmina (administrative district) in Dębica County, Subcarpathian Voivodeship, in south-eastern Poland. Its seat is the town of Dębica, although the town is not part of the territory of the gmina.

Sołectwos
Gmina Dębica is subdivided into 19 sołectwos: Braciejowa, Brzeźnica, Brzeźnica-Wola, Głobikowa, Gumniska, Kędzierz, Kochanówka, Kozłów, Latoszyn, Nagawczyna, Paszczyna, Podgrodzie, Pustków-Wieś, Pustków Osiedle, Pustków-Krownice, Pustynia, Stasiówka, Stobierna and Zawada. Other villages include Bobrek (near Zawada).

Neighbouring gminas
Gmina Dębica is bordered by the town of Dębica and by the gminas of Brzostek, Czarna, Ostrów, Pilzno, Przecław, Ropczyce and Żyraków.

References
Polish official population figures 2006

Debica
Dębica County